Nikolai Pavlovich Khmelyov ,  — 1 November 1945) was a Soviet and Russian stage and film actor, theater director and pedagogue, associated with the Moscow Art Theatre and later the Yermolova Theatre.

Biography

Nikolai Khmelyov was born in Sormovo, Nizhny Novgorod, to a working-class family. "A man who was highly ambitious, always dissatisfied with himself and difficult to contact with," he joined the MAT's Second Studio in 1919, soon to become "one of the most intriguing figures of the 'second generation' of MAT actors," according to the theatre historian Inna Solovyova. He excelled in the parts of Tsar Fyodor in Tsar Fyodor Ioannovich by Aleksey Tolstoy (1935), Karenin in Anna Karenina (1937), Tuzenbach in Three Sisters by Anton Chekhov (1940), but before that as Alexey Turbin in The Days of the Turbins by Mikhail Bulgakov, which brought him critical recognition and fame in 1926.

"Khmelyov imparted his characters with extreme tension and clarity… His stage moves were both highly elaborate and unexpected, he was totally free in his choice of stylistic means and emotional colours, and he loved the sudden change of perspectives," Solovyova wrote. His Karenin and Turbin were lavishly praised by Joseph Stalin who, upon seeing MAT's Anna Karenina in 1937, instantly issued an order for Khmelyov and Alla Tarasova to be awarded the titles of the People's Artist of the USSR.

A respected pedagogue, in 1932 Khmelyov founded his own theatre studio. In 1937 it merged with Yermolova Theatre, which he was the director of in 1937–1945. In 1920–1939 he was cast in seven Soviet films, including Salamander (1928), Bezhin Meadow (1937) and The Man in a Case (1939). Khmelyov was a recipient of numerous state awards (including the Order of the Red Banner of Labour, 1937) and a three times Stalin Prize laureate (1941, 1942 and 1946, posthumously). Khmelyov died on 1 November 1945 in the theatre, during the rehearsals for Hard Days by Aleksey N. Tolstoy in which he played Ivan the Terrible. He is interred in Novodevichy Cemetery.

Filmography 
 1920 – Domestic Agitator – Groom
 1927 – The End of St. Petersburg – speculator
 1928 – Salamander – Prince Ruprecht Karlstein
 1932 – Dead House – Dostoevsky
 1936 – Generation of Winners – Evgeny Svetlov
 1936 – Bezhin Meadow – father Styopka
 1939 – The Man in a Case – Belikov

References 

1901 births
1945 deaths
20th-century Russian male actors
Actors from Nizhny Novgorod
Communist Party of the Soviet Union members
Honored Artists of the RSFSR
People's Artists of the USSR
Stalin Prize winners
Recipients of the Order of the Red Banner of Labour
Russian drama teachers
Russian male film actors
Russian male stage actors
Soviet drama teachers
Soviet male film actors
Soviet male stage actors
Soviet theatre directors
Burials at Novodevichy Cemetery